Darlington was a Legislative Assembly electorate in the state of Queensland. It was created in 1949 largely from the former Electoral district of Albert and was replaced (or renamed) in 1959 by the Electoral district of Logan.

Members

The following members represented Darlington.

Election results

See also
 Electoral districts of Queensland
 Members of the Queensland Legislative Assembly by year
 :Category:Members of the Queensland Legislative Assembly by name

References

Former electoral districts of Queensland
Constituencies established in 1950
Constituencies disestablished in 1960
1950 establishments in Australia
1960 disestablishments in Australia